The Booneville School District is a public school district based in Booneville, Mississippi (USA).

Schools
Booneville Middle/High School
Anderson Elementary School

Demographics

2006-07 school year
There were a total of 1,380 students enrolled in the Booneville School District during the 2006–2007 school year. The gender makeup of the district was 48% female and 52% male. The racial makeup of the district was 20.22% African American, 77.75% White, 1.09% Hispanic, 0.72% Asian, and 0.22% Native American. 34.1% of the district's students were eligible to receive free lunch.

Previous school years

Accountability statistics

See also
List of school districts in Mississippi

References

External links
 

Education in Prentiss County, Mississippi
School districts in Mississippi